The Dutch Eerste Divisie in the 1993–94 season was contested by 18 teams. Dordrecht'90 won the championship. The play-off system was expanded this season: instead of two groups of three teams, four teams entered each group now. The two new members both came from this league.

New entrants
Relegated from the Eredivisie 1992–93
 FC Den Bosch
 Dordrecht'90
 Fortuna Sittard

League standings

Promotion/relegation play-offs
In the promotion/relegation competition, eight entrants (six from this league and two from the Eredivisie) entered in two groups. The group winners were promoted to the Eredivisie.

See also
 Eredivisie 1993–94
 KNVB Cup 1993–94

References
Netherlands – List of final tables (RSSSF)

Eerste Divisie seasons
2
Neth